Hoya macgillivrayi is a fast-growing vine native to northeastern Australia that was first discovered in Queensland in the McIlwraith and Tozer Range by Frederick Manson Bailey. The plant was named after William David Kerr Macgillivray, who collected the type specimen.

Description
It has oval pointed leaves and has a twining growth habit.  The flowers of the plant are approximately 6 cm in diameter and vary slightly in size, shape, and color from each cultivar.  They come in umbels of 6 to 10 flowers that are each connected at a central axis.  Each flower is a dark burgundy color with five sepals and five petals.  The stamen are enclosed in the corona.  The fruit produced are two pairs of follicles that are 25 cm long from which a flat seed is produced that is distributed by the wind.  The seed takes a long time to germinate.

Cultivation
The plant requires well-drained soil and prefers to stay dry during the winter time.  It also likes to be kept rootbound. It requires protection in temperate climates, where it may be used as a houseplant.

It is listed as Rare on the 1997 IUCN Red list.

References

Bibliography
CONTRIBUTIONS TO THE FLORA OF QUEENSLAND Queensland Agricultural Journal Vol. 1 p. 190, F.M. Bailey,(1914)
Mullins, Effie. (1986). Hoya macgillivrayi. Growing Native Plants, Australian National Botanic Gardens. Accessed online: 28 February 2008.

macgillivrayi
Gentianales of Australia
Flora of Queensland
Rare flora of Australia
Vines